Jorge Maronna is an Argentine multi-instrumentalist, composer, singer, author and a founding member of the comedy-musical group Les Luthiers. Born August 1, 1948, in Bahía Blanca, he joined I Musicisti while still a teenager, and helped Gerardo Masana and Carlos Iraldi build the first informal instrument, the "contrachitarrone da gamba". In 1967, he was part of the four people who left I Musicisti and formed Les Luthiers. There, he and Masana composed most of the music for early shows, and to this day Maronna still pens many musical pieces for the group, often in collaboration with one of his bandmates.

As a member of Les Luthiers, he's been composer, lyricist, scriptwriter, singer and multi-instrumentalist, and he's also been conducting their rehearsals during the last years. He has reportedly played over 35 instruments for the group, including banjo, viola and bagpipes.

References 

1948 births
Argentine musicians
Les Luthiers
People from Bahía Blanca
Living people